Tabebuia roseo-alba, known as white ipê, ipê-branco or lapacho blanco, is a tree native to Cerrado and Pantanal vegetation in Brazil, but also appears in Argentina (especially in the "Esteros del Ibera" wetlands) and more rarely in Paraguay.

This plant is frequently used as an ornamental plant and honey plant in Brazil and Argentina. On the other hand, its flowers seem to be less popular with many hummingbirds than those of other Tabebuia, being visited mostly by the occasional generalist species like the gilded sapphire (Hylocharis chrysura).

References

  (2005): Beija-flores (Aves, Trochilidae) e seus recursos florais em uma área urbana do Sul do Brasil  [Hummingbirds (Aves, Trochilidae) and their flowers in an urban area of southern Brazil]. [Portuguese with English abstract] Revista Brasileira de Zoologia 22(1): 51–59.  PDF fulltext
  (1994): Plantas do Pantanal [Plants of Pantanal]. [In Portuguese] EMBRAPA.

External links
Photos of Tabebuia roseo-alba

roseo-alba
Trees of Argentina
Trees of Brazil
Flora of the Cerrado
Garden plants of South America
Ornamental trees